Philippe-Alexis Béancourt (10 June 1792 – 6 January 1862) was a 19th-century French composer and conductor.

Biography
Born in Versailles (city), Béancourt was a composer of stage music. He was also the conductor of the Théâtre des Nouveautés (1827–1831), the Théâtre Comte (1830), and then the Théâtre de la Gaîté (1835–1849).

He died in Paris.

Works
 Faust, lyrics by Emmanuel Théaulon and Jean-Baptiste Gondelier, morceaux détachés singing and piano (or harp), 1827
 Rendez-vous, lyrics by Mathurin-Joseph Brisset, 1827
 Jean, lyrics by Théaulon and Alphonse Signol, air, chant et piano, 1828
 La Tache de sang, three-act drama, with Julien de Mallian (libretto), 1835
 Les Sept châteaux du diable, féerie, quadrille for the piano, Théâtre Impérial du Châtelet, with Philippe Musard, lyrics by Adolphe d'Ennery and Clairville, 1844
 Air de la fiancée, lyrics by Achille d'Artois, undated
 Air de Mr Jovial, lyrics by Adolphe Choquart and Théaulon, undated

References

External links

1792 births
1862 deaths
19th-century classical composers
19th-century French composers
19th-century French male musicians
French conductors (music)
French Romantic composers
French male conductors (music)
People from Versailles